Swing is a soundtrack for the 1999 film of the same name, which stars Lisa Stansfield, who also recorded ten songs for the soundtrack and co-wrote four of them. The album was released in Europe on 10 May 1999 and in North America on 13 July 1999. Swing garnered favorable reviews from music critics who called it a "gem" among the soundtracks. The album, full of jazz and swing songs, reached number six on Billboard'''s Top Jazz Albums chart. On 2 June 2003, it was remastered and re-released in Europe with an alternative cover art.

Background
In 1999, Stansfield starred in the Nick Mead-directed film Swing with actor Hugo Speer, and recorded cover versions of swing songs and a few original songs written in this style for the soundtrack. The film premiered on 7 May 1999, and the soundtrack was released three days later.

Content
The album contains fifteen jazz and swing songs performed by Stansfield (ten tracks), Georgie Fame (two tracks) and Ian Devaney (three instrumental tracks). Among them, Stansfield co-wrote four new songs: "Gotta Get on This Train", "Why Do We Call It Love", "I Thought That's What You Liked About Me" and "Two Years Too Blue". She has also recorded eight covers: "Ain't What You Do" (from 1939), "Ain't Nobody Here but Us Chickens" (from 1946), "Baby I Need Your Lovin'" (from 1964), "Our Love Is Here to Stay" (from 1938), "Watch the Birdie" (from 1941), "The Best Is Yet to Come" (from 1959), "Blitzkrieg Baby" (from 1940) and "Mack the Knife" (from 1928).

Critical reception

The album received positive reviews from music critics. According to Mark Allan from AllMusic, Swing is a "gem of a soundtrack. [...] The bright, sassy arrangements are fine showcases for Stansfield's confident, take-charge vocals". Allan also said that "[e]ven if the movie stinks, there's the music to remember".

Commercial receptionSwing reached number six on Billboard'''s Top Jazz Albums and number 165 on the UK Albums Chart.

Track listing

Charts

Credits and personnel
Credits taken from AllMusic.

Tim Baxter - assistant engineer
Vicky Brown - violins, additional arrangements
Hugh Buckley - guitars
Richie Buckley - saxophone
Clarence Clemons - saxophone
Tony Cousins - mastering
Jacquie Darbyshire - personal management
John Thirkell - trumpet
Snake Davis - saxophone
Ian Devaney - producer, arranger, keyboards, guitars
Georgie Fame - vocals
Geoff Gascoyne - bass
Rachel George - personal assistant
Carl Geraghty - saxophone
Leo Green - saxophone
Gavin Harrison - drums
Matt Holland - trumpet
Tommy Manzi - management
Stephen McDonnell - trumpet, additional arrangements
Adrian McGovern - recording, mix engineer
Nigel Mooney - guitars
Martin Rhodes - studio management
Karl Ronan - trombone
Lisa Stansfield - vocals
John Wadham - drums
Kevin Whitehead - drums

Release history

References

Lisa Stansfield albums
1999 soundtrack albums
1990s film soundtrack albums
Jazz soundtracks